Tan-y-Bwlch railway station is the principal intermediate passenger station on the narrow gauge Ffestiniog Railway, which was built in 1836 to carry dressed slate from Blaenau Ffestiniog to Porthmadog for export by sea. The station lies off the B4410 former turnpike road from Maentwrog to Llanfrothen and Beddgelert, which the railway crosses on a fine cast-iron skew bridge (made at Boston Lodge foundry in 1854 and surmounted by 'gothic' balustrades).

Hafod y Llyn 

From 1863 until 1873, the only regular passing station for trains was at the former horse stage at Hafod y Llyn, a few hundred yards down route (south-west) from Tan-y-Bwlch. Hafod y Llyn opened for passengers on 6 January 1865 but was very difficult of access. There is little to see of the location now, apart from a widening of the formation, and a gate into the woods.

History 
Hafod y Llyn was replaced by the new station at Tan-y-Bwlch, which opened in July 1873 and closed to passengers on 15 September 1939.

Passenger service to Tan-y-Bwlch was resumed on 5 April 1958, and the station was the terminus of the railway until  was reopened in 1968. However, Tan-y-Bwlch continued as the main station for the upper part of the line for years afterwards, as Dduallt had very limited facilities and no road access.

Station house 
Mr and Mrs Will Jones have long been associated with Tan-y-Bwlch station. They lived in the station house from their marriage in 1929 to their retirement in 1968. In the 1930s and again in the 1950s and 1960s, the late Bessie Jones gained world-wide fame as the station-mistress wearing traditional Welsh costume and serving teas in the station house. Will Jones was a well-respected track man and passed on some of his skills to countless volunteers over the final 14 years of his employment.

Bessie Jones (played none too sympathetically by Louie Emery) even appeared in Michael Powell's 1935 thriller The Phantom Light, which opens with an extended scene at the Station featuring the film's heroine, played by Binnie Hale.

Features and facilities 

In addition to the station house, Tan-y-Bwlch has an original wooden station building, a modern water tank (built in the early 1990s) and a 1970s building intended as a signal box (now containing the telephone exchange and the relays for the automatic crossing equipment).

The former stone built goods shed now serves as a shop, café and information centre, with modern extensions housing kitchens and passenger amenities. Car parking and a picnic area are provided.

A feature of the station for many years was the long white paling fence observable in early photographs. This fence, 900 ft long, was recreated in 1970 by volunteers. The 89 ten-foot panels were replaced in 1995, and in late 2006 the entire fence was in turn replaced, again by volunteers, using 74 similar twelve-foot panels and new gates – but creosoted, rather than painted. A reconstruction of 1999 is a static replica of the early-style slotted post semaphore signal that dominated the station in Victorian times. This early type of signal is no longer used on the Ffestiniog Railway, which now uses more modern equipment for train control.

Tourist facilities include a nature trail through woodlands leading to Llyn Mair ("Mary's Lake") as well as longer signposted walks. There is also a play area at the station.

Services

References

Further reading

External links 

 The Ffestiniog Railway Company's website
 Ffestiniog Railway Timetables
 Multimap Map of Tan-y-Bwlch

Heritage railway stations in Gwynedd
Ffestiniog Railway
Maentwrog
Railway stations in Great Britain opened in 1873
Railway stations in Great Britain closed in 1939
Railway stations in Great Britain opened in 1958